Quantum Love is a 2014 French film written and directed by Lisa Azuelos and starring Sophie Marceau and François Cluzet.

Plot
Pierre (François Cluzet) has been happily married for fifteen years and a good father. Still in love with his wife, he enjoys his wife and family and is content. One evening, he meets Elsa (Sophie Marceau) at a party and are immediately attracted to each other. Fifteen days later, they happen to meet again and the mutual attraction turns into infatuation. But his love for his wife and Elsa's rule about not dating married men prevents them from taking the next step. Instead, they fantasize about each other, and soon the fantasies mingle with the reality.

Cast

 Sophie Marceau as Elsa
 François Cluzet as Pierre
 Lisa Azuelos as Anne
 Alexandre Astier as Éric
 Arthur Benzaquen as Julien
 Jonathan Cohen as Marc
 Niels Schneider as Hugo
 Stéphanie Murat as Valérie
 Olivia Côte as Caro
 Syrus Shahidi as Un ami de Julien
 Lily Taieb as Lily
 Jules Benchetrit as Louis
 Tatiana Khayat as Lola
 Stylane Lecaille as Ben
 Thaïs Alessandrin as Jeanne

Production
Quantum Love was filmed in Paris, France.

References

External links
 
 

2014 films
Pathé films
French romantic drama films
2010s French-language films
Films set in France
Films shot in France
Films directed by Lisa Azuelos
2010s French films